Gerald Salem Baker (born 7 October 1960), known as Gerry Baker, is a lawn bowler.

Bowls career
Baker is from Bloemfontein, in South Africa and has won three medals at the World Outdoor Championships and three medals at the Commonwealth Games. He broke a South African record by appearing at six Commonwealth Games.

In 1996, he won the Hong Kong International Bowls Classic pairs title with Neil Burkett. In 1998 he won a bronze medal in the singles at the 1998 Kuala Lumpur Commonwealth Games and two years later he teamed up with Shaun Addinall to claim a Pairs silver medal in the 2000 World Outdoor Bowls Championship in Johannesburg. Another bronze arrived in 2002 with Addinall in the Pairs during the 2002 Manchester Commonwealth Games before he and Addinall finally won a Gold Medal in the Pairs at the 2010 Delhi Commonwealth Games.

In 2007 he won the fours gold medal at the Atlantic Bowls Championships.
In 2009 he won the singles gold medal at the Atlantic Championships and two years later won the pairs gold medal at the 2011 Atlantic Championships.

His most recent success came in the 2012 World Outdoor Bowls Championship when he picked up a fifth medal of note by claiming bronze in the Singles in Adelaide.

He was selected as part of the South Africa team for the 2018 Commonwealth Games on the Gold Coast in Queensland (his sixth Games).

At national level he has finished runner-up three times at the South African National Bowls Championships bowling for the Belgravia Bowls Club.

Business career
Baker was appointed as a Director of World Bowls on 1 June 2020.

References

External links
  (2014)
 
 
 

1960 births
Living people
South African male bowls players
Commonwealth Games medallists in lawn bowls
Commonwealth Games gold medallists for South Africa
Commonwealth Games bronze medallists for South Africa
Bowls players at the 1998 Commonwealth Games
Bowls players at the 2002 Commonwealth Games
Bowls players at the 2006 Commonwealth Games
Bowls players at the 2010 Commonwealth Games
Bowls players at the 2014 Commonwealth Games
Bowls players at the 2018 Commonwealth Games
Sportspeople from Bloemfontein
Medallists at the 1998 Commonwealth Games
Medallists at the 2002 Commonwealth Games
Medallists at the 2010 Commonwealth Games